Eighth Avenue or Eighth Avenue station may refer to:

Roads
Islamabad Highway or 8th Avenu, a main highway in and near Islamabad, Pakistan
Eighth Avenue (Manhattan)
Eighth Avenue (Brooklyn)

Subway stations
Eighth Avenue station (BMT Canarsie Line), a station at 14th Street in Manhattan
Eighth Avenue station (BMT Sea Beach Line), a station at 62nd Street in Brooklyn
Eighth Avenue station (IRT Sixth Avenue Line), a former station at 53rd Street in Manhattan

Transit lines
IND Eighth Avenue Line, a rapid transit line in Manhattan
Eighth Avenue Line (Manhattan surface) or M10 and M20 buses
Eighth Avenue Line (Brooklyn surface), a bus line, formerly a streetcar line in Brooklyn

See also 
Eighth Avenue Place (Calgary)
Eighth Street (disambiguation)